Racing Murcia City 1913 Fútbol Club is a football club based in Murcia a district in center of Murcia Center, Murcia, Spain. Founded on 1 September 2013, it plays in Tercera División RFEF – Group 13, holding home games at the Estadio Universitario with a capacity of 10,000

History
The club was founded on 1 September 2013 under the name of DiTT Redmóvil Asociación Deportiva, being registered in the Football Federation of the Region of Murcia for the 2014–15 season. In 2016, the club was renamed into Racing Murcia FC, after being in the Preferente Autonómica.

In 2020, Racing Murcia achieved promotion to Tercera División, while also qualifying for the Copa del Rey for the first time in their history. Funded by the Racing City Group, the club signed several former footballers to their organizational chart, such as Edwin Congo, and Paul Pogba's brother Mathias Pogba as a player. Also in June 2021 the club announced Fernando Morientes ex Real Madrid and Liverpool Legend as International Director

In January 2021, president Morris Pagniello signed former Real Madrid star Royston Drente
In January 2022 Indo / Canadian Steve Nijaar ex sportsman now businessman is announced as New President

Season to season

1 season in Tercera División
1 season in Tercera División RFEF

Players

First-team squad

References

External links
Official website 
Fútbol Regional team profile 
Soccerway team profile

Football clubs in the Region of Murcia
Association football clubs established in 2013
2013 establishments in Spain